LEPP may refer to:

 Pamplona Airport in Pamplona, Spain, ICAO airport code LEPP
 Laboratory for Elementary-Particle Physics at Cornell University
 Lepp, an Estonian surname